F. Bam Morrison is an American fraudster who fooled the town of Wetumka, Oklahoma, into sponsoring a non-existent circus. Some authorities name him as J. Bam Morrison.

Morrison arrived at Wetumka in 1950 claiming to be an advance public-relations man for the Bohn's United Circus, which was supposedly coming to town in three weeks, on (July 24). He promised great opportunities in the form of tourism and the local purchase of circus supplies.

Morrison sold advertising space on the circus grounds, promising that the circus would buy its supplies exclusively from the advertisers. The merchants of the town stocked their storage spaces in expectation of increased sales. Morrison collected all money in cash and, after two weeks, he left.

No circus arrived on July 24. Residents of Wetumka decided to spend the day in celebration anyway and started the tradition of the annual Sucker Day with a parade and street fair. Sucker Day has been celebrated every year since, with the exception of 2003.

References
 Museum of Hoaxes about the Sucker Day and Morrison
 Time article from 1950 about the first Sucker Day

American fraudsters
Year of birth missing
Year of death missing
People from Wetumka, Oklahoma